Sir Peter Henry Buck  (ca. October 1877 – 1 December 1951), also known as Te Rangi Hīroa or Te Rangihīroa, was a New Zealand doctor, military leader, health administrator, politician, anthropologist and museum director. He was a prominent member of Ngāti Mutunga, his mother's Māori iwi.

Early life
Peter Buck was born in Urenui, New Zealand, the only child of Anglo-Irish immigrant William Henry Buck and Rina, a Māori woman. William's wife Ngarongo-ki-tua had been unable to have children and, in line with Māori custom, Rina, one of Ngarongo's relatives, became part of the household and produced a child for the couple. Rina died soon after Peter was born, and Ngarongo raised him as her own. He claimed to have been born in 1880, but the register of the primary school he attended records October 1877, which is likely to be correct.

Te Rangi Hīroa was descended on his Māori (maternal) side from the Taranaki iwi of Ngāti Mutunga. In his teens, his elders gave him the name Te Rangi Hīroa (also written Te Rangihiroa) in honour of an uncle of Ngarongo's and an earlier notable ancestor. His paternal ancestry was English and Irish. Though he was largely brought up within the Pākehā community, Ngarongo-ki-tua and his great-aunt Kapuakore instilled a love of Māori tradition and language in him.

After Ngarongo's death in 1892 he moved with his father to the Wairarapa. In 1896 he enrolled at Te Aute College, a school that produced many Māori leaders of the time. In 1899 he was named Dux and passed a medical preliminary examination entitling him to attend the University of Otago Medical School.

Te Rangi Hīroa was later associated with the Young Māori Party.

Medical school and practice

Buck did well at Otago Medical School, where he also succeeded in sport, becoming national long jump champion in 1900 and 1903. He completed his MB ChB in 1904, and an MD six years later. His doctoral thesis, completed in 1910, was titled Medicine amongst the Maoris in ancient and modern times. During this time, in 1905, he married Irish-born Margaret Wilson. Their long marriage was often fiery, but was strong, and it was Margaret who often gave the impetus to Peter's career.

In November 1905 Buck was appointed as a medical officer to Māori, working under Māui Pōmare, initially in the southern North Island, then in the far north. Between them Pomare and Buck campaigned successfully to improve sanitation in the small Māori communities around the country.

Parliament and war

In 1909, Hone Heke Ngapua, Member of Parliament for Northern Maori died suddenly. Buck was singled out by Native Minister James Carroll to be his replacement. Buck accepted and was elected in the subsequent by-election. He became a member of the Native Affairs Committee. He did not seek re-election to the seat in 1914, but stood for the Bay of Islands electorate, where he lost with a narrow margin. By this time, Buck had developed an interest in Pacific Island peoples, working briefly as a medical officer in both the Cook Islands and Niue during parliamentary breaks.

During the First World War, Buck helped in the recruitment of a Māori volunteer contingent. Buck joined this contingent as medical officer, travelling to the Middle East in 1915. He took part at Gallipoli, later being awarded a Distinguished Service Order for his heroism. He later saw action in France and Belgium, before being posted to the No 3 New Zealand General Hospital at Codford, England, in 1918.

Returning to New Zealand, Buck was appointed as Chief Maori Medical Officer, and in 1921 was named director of the Maori Hygiene Division in the Department of Health.

Bishop Museum

Buck gained a five-year research fellowship at the Bishop Museum in Honolulu, Hawaii, in 1927. At the end of the fellowship in 1932 he was appointed Bishop Museum visiting professor of anthropology at Yale University. He was promoted to Director of the Bishop Museum in 1936, a position he held until his death in 1951. He also served as a Trustee and President of the Board of Trustees of the museum. During his directorship, Buck applied for U.S. Citizenship, which was denied. The Polynesians are classed as Orientals in spite of anthropological evidence of their Caucasian origin so I could only show 50%.”

Awards and tributes
In 1935, he was awarded the King George V Silver Jubilee Medal. In the 1946 King's Birthday Honours, Buck was appointed a Knight Commander of the Order of St Michael and St George for services to science and literature.

The Te Rangi Hiroa Medal is a social sciences award given biennially by the Royal Society of New Zealand. It is awarded for work in one of four disciplines: historical approaches to societal transformation and change; current issues in cultural diversity and cohesion; social and economic policy and development; and medical anthropology.

One of the residential colleges of the University of Otago is named Te Rangi Hīroa College in his honour.

Bibliography

Footnotes

Further reading

External links
eTexts of books (5) by Te Rangi Hīroa
Otago University: Te Rangi Hīroa (alumni profile)
Military Personnel File online; digitised record at Archives New Zealand.

1877 births
1951 deaths
New Zealand Companions of the Distinguished Service Order
New Zealand Knights Commander of the Order of St Michael and St George
Māori history
Māori in the military
New Zealand MPs for Māori electorates
New Zealand public health doctors
20th-century New Zealand historians
New Zealand Liberal Party MPs
New Zealand people of World War I
People from Taranaki
University of Otago alumni
Historians of Hawaii
New Zealand anthropologists
People educated at Te Aute College
New Zealand Māori medical doctors
New Zealand Māori academics
Members of the New Zealand House of Representatives
Unsuccessful candidates in the 1914 New Zealand general election
Māori studies academics
20th-century New Zealand medical doctors
New Zealand male long jumpers
Māori and Pacific Island scientists
Yale University faculty